Wingko, wiwingka or bibika, which is sometimes called wingko babat, wiwingka or bibika (rev. De voeding in Nederlands-Indië 1904), is a traditional Indonesian pancake-like snack made from coconuts. This kue is usually associated with Javanese cuisine.

Wingko is a type of cake made mainly of coconut and other ingredients. Wingko is popular especially along the north coast of Java island. It is sold mostly by peddlers on trains, at bus or train stations, or in the producer's own shop. This might explain its popularity in Java to as a gift to families upon returning from traveling.

Wingko is typically a round, almost hard coconut cake that is typically served in warm, small pieces. Wingko is sold either in the form of a large, plate-sized cake or small, paper wrapped cakes.

The most famous wingko is made in Babat. As its full name, wingko babat, suggests, wingko actually originated in Babat, a small district in Lamongan regency in East Java, near the border with the regency of Bojonegoro. In Babat, which is only a small town, wingko plays a big role in its economy. There are many wingko factories in that city, employing many workers. The factories receive much coconut fruit from the neighbouring municipalities.

Today wingko is a famous food in both Babat with various brands and sizes of wingko for sale. Most wingko factories are still owned by Indonesian Chinese and some still use Chinese language names for their brands.

See also

Bibingka - a similar rice cake from eastern Indonesia and the Philippines

References

Kue
Javanese cuisine
Desserts
Indonesian desserts
Vegetarian dishes of Indonesia
Foods containing coconut